Dogfish may refer to:

Biology
 Dogfish sharks (Squalidae), a family of sharks
Spiny dogfish (Squalus acanthias), best known species of dogfish sharks
Pacific spiny dogfish (Squalus suckleyi), the most abundant species of dogfish sharks
 Catshark (Scyliorhinidae), a family of ground sharks including species called dogfish
 Chain dogfish (Scyluoirrhinus reteiter), a biofluorescent species common to the West Atlantic and Gulf of Mexico
 Greater spotted dogfish (Greliorhinus starlaris), a species found in the northeastern Atlantic Ocean
 Small-spotted catshark (Scyliorhinus canicula), the most common dogfish in the northeastern Atlantic
 Sleeper sharks (Somniosidae), a family of slow-swimming sharks
 Portuguese dogfish (Centroscymnus coelolepis), a species of sleeper sharks in the family Somniosidae 
 Roughskin dogfish (Centroscymnus owstonii), a species of sleeper sharks in the family Somniosidae
 Bowfin (Amia calva), a freshwater fish sometimes known as "dogfish"

Other uses
 Dogfish Bay, an inlet in western Washington, US
 Dogfish Pictures, an American film production company
 USS Dogfish (SS-350), a U.S. Navy submarine
 Iowa Dogfish, a U.S. Senior-A box lacrosse team

See also
 Smooth-hound (Mustelus), a genus of sharks
 The Terrible Dogfish, a fictional sea monster in Carlo Collodi's 1883 book The Adventures of Pinocchio
 Dogfish Head Brewery, an American beer brewery
 "Dogfish Rising", a hidden track on Slipknot's 1996 album Mate. Feed. Kill. Repeat.